Robert Alon (born July 10, 1990, in Santa Monica, California) is an American racing driver.

Racing record

Career summary

Motorsports career results

American open–wheel racing
(key) (Races in bold indicate pole position; races in italics indicate fastest lap)

U.S. F2000 National Championship

WeatherTech SportsCar Championship results
(key)(Races in bold indicate pole position. Races in italics indicate fastest race lap in class. Results are overall/class)

References

External links
  
 Robert Alon

1990 births
Living people
Racing drivers from California
Racing drivers from Los Angeles
Sportspeople from Santa Monica, California
WeatherTech SportsCar Championship drivers

JDC Motorsports drivers
U.S. F2000 National Championship drivers